Pauingassi First Nation is an Anishinaabe (Saulteaux/Ojibwa) First Nation community located approximately  northeast of Winnipeg, Manitoba, and  north of Little Grand Rapids, Manitoba, on a peninsula jutting southward into Fishing Lake, a tributary of Berens River.

The main economic base of the community remains hunting, fishing, trapping and wild rice harvesting.

Governance

Originally part of Little Grand Rapids First Nation, the Pauingassi received reserve status in 1988 and became a separate First Nation from the Little Grand Rapids First Nation on 7 October 1991.

Today, Pauingassi First Nation is governed by the Custom Electoral System of government. Pauingassi First Nation is a member of the Southeast Resource Development Council and a signatory to Treaty 5.

References

External links
 AANDC profile
 2004-2005 First Nations Community Profiles - MB Region
 Southeast Community Futures Development Corporation profile
 Map of Pauingassi First Nation at Statcan

Southeast Resource Development Council
Saulteaux